Csaba Szabo, a physician and pharmacologist, is the Head of the Pharmacology Section of the University of Fribourg in Switzerland. The Public Library of Science Magazine, PLOS Biology, recognized Szabo in 2019 as one of the most cited researchers in the world.

Early life 
Szabo was born in Győr, Hungary on July 12, 1967. He received his M.D. from the Semmelweis University Medical School in Budapest in 1992. From 1992 to 1994 he trained in pharmacology at the William Harvey Institute in London with Nobel Laureate Sir John Vane and received a Ph.D. in pharmacology. Szabo also holds a Ph.D. in physiology, and a Doctor of Sciences degree from the Hungarian University of Sciences.
From 2018 he serves as the Chair of the Pharmacology Section at the University of Fribourg, Switzerland.

Research 
Szabo’s research investigates the biological roles of small diffusible, labile gaseous molecules (gasotransmitters) in health and disease. His early work focused on the role of the gaseous mediator nitric oxide (a small diffusible biological mediator produced by nitric oxide synthases) in the blood vessel dysfunction and organ injury associated with circulatory shock. In addition to unveiling a new pathophysiological concept, this work also yielded new pharmacological tools, such as selective inhibitors of the inducible isoform of nitric oxide synthase.

Subsequent work conducted by Szabo and his collaborators in the early 2000’s defined the role of a labile reactive species called peroxynitrite – formed by the reaction of superoxide and nitric oxide – in various disease states, including circulatory shock, inflammation, and the complications of diabetes. In particular, these studies demonstrated that peroxynitrite induces breaks in the strands of the genetic material, DNA, which activate poly (ADP-ribose) polymerase (PARP), a mammalian nuclear and mitochondrial enzyme, which, in turn, induces cell necrosis, promotes inflammation and impairs vascular reactivity in various diseases. He is currently spearheading an effort to repurpose clinically used inhibitors of PARP – which are currently only used in cancer therapy – for the experimental therapy of non-oncological diseases, such as circulatory shock and acute lung failure.

Since 2007 Szabo’s research interest expanded into the roles of hydrogen sulfide (another gaseous biological mediator) in health and disease. His work identified novel roles of hydrogen sulfide as a mitigator of heart damage during heart attacks, as a stimulator of new blood vessel formation, as a protector of blood vessels during diabetes, and as a stimulator of the cellular bioenergetics of mammalian cells.

In the context of disease pathogenesis, in 2013, while at the University of Texas, he discovered that colon cancer cells upregulate hydrogen sulfide biosynthesis in order to stimulate their growth, promote tumor blood vessel formation and to resist chemotherapy. In 2018 Szabo and his collaborators also demonstrated that bacterially-produced hydrogen sulfide protects the bacteria against immune-cell-mediated elimination. In 2019 Szabo’s group in Fribourg, Switzerland experimentally proved the “Kamoun Hypothesis”, and demonstrated that excessive generation of hydrogen sulfide leads to the metabolic inhibition and synaptic dysfunction of neurons in Down syndrome.

In 1996 he co-founded a company called Inotek and served as its Chief Scientific Officer. The company focused on the development of various novel small molecules, including new inhibitors of PARP. One of the compounds discovered by Inotek, PJ34, is a commonly used experimental tool to inhibit PARP. Another, PARP inhibitor, INO-1001, entered clinical trials and Inotek partnered its development with Genentech in 2006. In 2021, Szabo’s team demonstrated that low concentrations of the gaseous molecule cyanide – previously known only for its toxic effects – at ultra-low concentrations, can also have beneficial, i.e. stimulatory bioenergetic effects in mammalian cells, thereby raising the possibility of cyanide being the fourth mammalian gaseous transmitter after nitric oxide, carbon monoxide and hydrogen sulfide.

Awards & Honors
According 2022 Elsevier Worldwide Citation Metrics Index, Dr. Szabo is in the top 1% of the top 2% of all scientists worldwide, at the overall spot of 456 out of those 100,000 scientists who made this top 2% list. Also he is in #5 spot among scientists working in Switzerland.
 Novartis Prize of the British Pharmacological Society, 2003.
 Dennis Gabor Innovation Award, 2004.
 Officer's Cross - Order of Merit Award of the Hungarian Republic, 2006.
 Texas Star Award - University of Texas System.
 Elected Fellow of the British Pharmacological Society, 2012.
 Recognized as one of the most cited researchers, listed among the top 1,000 worldwide, PLOS Biology,
 John Vane Medal or the British Pharmacological Society, 2021.
 Highly Cited Researcher in Pharmacology, 2022.

Publications
Szabo authored or co-authored over 500 publications, which were cited over 75,000 times, yielding a H-index of 140.

Books

 Cell Death: the role of PARP, 2000 (Taylor Francis).
 Adenosine Receptors, 2006 (Taylor Francis).
 Biomolecules, Section Editor-In-Chief.

References

External links
Google Scholar - Csaba Szabo

1967 births
Living people
Hungarian physicians
Hungarian pharmacologists
Semmelweis University alumni
Academic staff of the University of Fribourg